The Marten Bequest is an Australian charitable trust, from which scholarships are awarded by the Australia Council for the Arts on behalf of the trustee, Perpetual Limited. The scholarships are known as the Marten Bequest Travelling Scholarship or just Marten Bequest Scholarship. The trust was formed from the estate of John Chisholm Marten (1908–1966).

John Marten
John Chisholm Marten (1908–1966), who used Jon Marten as his stage and pen name, was born in the county of Kent, England, migrating to Australia at a young age and living in Sydney for most of his adult life. He trained in Spanish dancing in Spain, before returning to Britain  to serve in the merchant navy during World War II. He took up dancing again with Californian dancer Doris Nile, and appeared in a royal gala performance at the Tivoli Theatre, Sydney, in 1954. when Queen Elizabeth II visited Australia. His career was as a performing artist. 

Martn co-wrote The Bali Ballet Murders with Cornelius Conyn, which was published in Australia, London and also translated into Dutch and published in the Netherlands. He was also known for his philanthropy and support of the arts.

Marten established the trust in order to help young creative artists in several disciplines to pay for their training and study programs.

History
The first scholarships were awarded in 1975, when three scholarships were awarded, for ballet, singing and instrumental music.

In 2017, there were 12 scholarships across six categories on offer, worth a total of A$600,000. Perpetual Limited has been the trustee since 2014.

Scholarships
Administered by the Australia Council, the trust operates as  a scholarship fund for various types of creators in the arts, including acting, architecture, ballet, instrumental music, painting, poetry, prose, sculpture and singing.  Open to Australian citizens aged between 21 and 35 (or 17–35 for ballet),  the scholarships are worth , and are paid over two years in instalments.

The number of recipients has varied each year.  In 2022 there were seven winners.

Selected winners
Many notable Australian creatives have won Marten Bequest Travelling Scholarships, including:

Tim Winton (1987), writer
Susan Lyons (1992), actress
Delia Falconer (1997), writer
Suneeta Peres da Costa (2002), writer
Rachael Coopes (2004), actress
Anthony White (2007), painter
Eryn Jean Norvill (2015), actress
 Abdul Abdullah (2021), painter

Footnotes

References

1975 establishments in Australia